Jazz Tango, is a studio album by Argentine pianist, composer, and arranger Pablo Ziegler. The album won Ziegler the 2018 Grammy Award for Best Latin Jazz Album, his second Grammy.

Track listing
Source

 Michelangelo 70  (Astor Piazzolla)  5:01
 La Fundición  (Pablo Ziegler)  6:24
 Milonga Del Adiós (Ziegler)  9:25
 Buenos Aires Report (Ziegler)  5:01
 Blues Porteño (Ziegler)  7:40
 Fuga Y Misterio  (Piazzolla)  5:16
 Elegante Canyenguito (Ziegler)  5:52
 La Rayuela (Ziegler)  5:31
 Muchacha De Boedo (Ziegler)  9:11
 Libertango  (Piazzolla)  8:23

Personnel
Source

 Pablo Ziegler – Piano, arranger, composer, producer
 Hector del Curto – Bandoneon
 Claudio Ragazzi – Guitar
 Kabir Sehgal – Producer
 Joachim Becker – Executive producer
 Oscar Zambrano – Recording, mixing & mastering engineer

References

2017 albums
Pablo Ziegler albums
Grammy Award for Best Latin Jazz Album